Osvaldo Cruz is a municipality in the Brazilian state of São Paulo. The population is 33,000 (2020 est.) in an area of 248 km². The elevation is 485 m.  It was founded in 1941 by Max Wirth, a Swiss citizen who immigrated to Brazil searching for new agricultural lands. First named "Nova Califórnia" the small village was created on Guataporanga Farm.

References

Municipalities in São Paulo (state)